p Velorum (abbreviated to p Vel) is a triple star system in the constellation Vela. Parallax measurements by the Hipparcos spacecraft put it at a distance of 87.5 light-years, or 26.8 parsecs from Earth. It is visible to the naked eye with a combined apparent magnitude of 3.83.

The primary component is a spectroscopic binary whose components have an orbital period of 10.21 days. The inner spectroscopic binary consists of two F-type stars, a subgiant and a main-sequence star. There is a companion star which is a white A-type main-sequence star, with an apparent magnitude of 5.76. It is separated 0.361 arcseconds from the primary and has an orbital period of 16.651 years.

References

Velorum, p
Spectroscopic binaries
Triple star systems
Vela (constellation)
A-type main-sequence stars
F-type main-sequence stars
F-type subgiants
Durchmusterung objects
92139
051986
4167